Debut is a 2017 Belarusian documentary film directed by Anastasiya Miroshnichenko. It was selected as the Belarusian entry for the Best International Feature Film at the 92nd Academy Awards, but it was not nominated.

Premise
Eleven female convicts in a Belarusian prison participate in a theater play.

See also
 List of submissions to the 92nd Academy Awards for Best International Feature Film
 List of Belarusian submissions for the Academy Award for Best International Feature Film

References

External links
 

2017 films
2017 documentary films
Belarusian documentary films
2010s Russian-language films